Tylomelania abendanoni is a species of freshwater snail with an operculum, an aquatic gastropod mollusk in the family Pachychilidae.

The specific name abendanoni is in honor of Dutch malacologist Eduard Cornelius Abendanon (1878-1962).

Distribution 
This species occurs in Malili Lakes, Sulawesi, Indonesia.

Ecology 
Tylomelania abendanoni is a lacustrine species.

The females of Tylomelania abendanoni usually have 1-4 embryos in their brood pouch. Newly hatched snails of Tylomelania abendanoni have a shell height of 1.0-6.5 mm.

References

abendanoni
Gastropods described in 1913